Beverly Holcombe Robertson (June 5, 1827 – December 12, 1910) was a cavalry officer in the United States Army on the Western frontier and a Confederate States Army general during the American Civil War.

Early life
Robertson was born on a plantation in Amelia County, Virginia. He received an appointment to the United States Military Academy, becoming a cadet in 1845 and graduated in 1849 as 25th out of 43. Assigned to the 2nd U.S. Dragoons as a second lieutenant, he attended the cavalry school at Carlisle Barracks. He then served on the frontier at various outposts in New Mexico Territory, Kansas Territory, and Nebraska Territory, fighting at various times with the Apache and Sioux. At one point Robertson courted Flora Cooke, the daughter of his regimental commander Philip St. George Cooke, but she eventually became the wife of J.E.B. Stuart. In 1855 he married Virginia Neville Johnston, a cousin to Joseph E. Johnston. In the same year Robertson was promoted to first lieutenant. In 1860 he became adjutant of the regiment while serving in Utah Territory, and soon was elevated to acting assistant adjutant general for the Department of Utah. He was promoted to captain in March 1861. However he was report to have pro-Confederate sentiments and when Virginia seceded he decided to follow his home state he tendered his resignation but instead was dismissed from the United States Army.

Civil War
In August 1861, after arriving in the east, he was appointed as Colonel and helped to organize the 4th Virginia Cavalry Regiment but failed to be reelected as regimental Colonel in early 1862. Nonetheless he was promoted to brigadier general on June 9, 1862. He led a brigade of Virginia cavalry in the Second Battle of Bull Run in August 1862, and the early part of the Maryland Campaign in September 1862. Prior to the Battle of Antietam, having a very mixed relation with his superiors, he was relieved of his command and ordered to North Carolina to recruit and train new cavalry regiments. Down there he commanded the Confederate forces at the Battle of White Hall.

After training and sending north several cavalry units, during the Gettysburg Campaign Robertson was back with the Army of Northern Virginia. He again commanded a brigade of cavalry, having brought with him the 4th and 5th North Carolina cavalry regiments, under Stuart. At the Battle of Brandy Station his men failed to significantly delay a Union column approaching Brandy Station from the southeast. He fought in Stuart's delaying actions in the Loudoun Valley at Middleburg and Upperville. Due to seniority, for parts of the campaign Robertson directed both his and "Grumble" Jones's brigades. Robertson helped cover Lee's retreat following the Battle of Gettysburg, the brigade having suffered heavy losses during the campaign.

He was assigned in October 1863 to command the Second Subdistrict of the Military District of South Carolina. He helped defend Charleston from enemy attack. Robertson served in the Carolinas Campaign and surrendered with Gen. Johnston.

Postbellum career
After the war, Robertson moved to Washington, D.C., and worked in the insurance business for several decades. He is buried in Robertson Cemetery near Scott's Fork, Amelia County, Virginia.

See also

List of American Civil War generals (Confederate)

Notes

References
 
 Eicher, John H., and David J. Eicher, Civil War High Commands. Stanford: Stanford University Press, 2001. .
 Text from Clement Evans' biography of Robertson
 Sifakis, Stewart. Who Was Who in the Civil War. New York: Facts On File, 1988. .
 Warner, Ezra J. Generals in Gray: Lives of the Confederate Commanders. Baton Rouge: Louisiana State University Press, 1959. .

Further reading
 Bowmaster, Patrick A., “’Bev’ Robertson Gets a C[arte] D[e] V[isite],” Military Images, May/June 2001, 29.
 Bowmaster, Patrick A., ed. “Confederate Brig. Gen. B.H. ‘Bev’ Robertson Interviewed on the Gettysburg Campaign,” Gettysburg, January 1999, 19-26.
 Bowmaster, Patrick A., ed. “A Letter to Mrs. Stuart,” Civil War, April 1997, 22-27. 
 Bowmaster, Patrick A., “Beverly H. Robertson and the Battle of Brandy Station,” Blue and Gray, fall 1996, 20-22, 24-33.

External links

1827 births
1910 deaths
Confederate States Army brigadier generals
United States Military Academy alumni
People of Virginia in the American Civil War
United States Army officers
Southern Historical Society